The Women's 80 metres hurdles competition at the 1968 Summer Olympics in Mexico City, Mexico was held at the University Olympic Stadium on October 17–18.

Competition format
The Women's 80m hurdles competition consisted of heats (Round 1), Semifinals and a Final. The three fastest competitors from each race in the heats qualified for the semifinals, along with the fastest overall competitor not already qualified. The top four athletes from each semifinals race advanced to the final.

Records
Prior to this competition, the existing world and Olympic records were as follows:

Results

Round 1
Qual. rule: first 3 of each heat (Q) plus the next fastest time (q) qualified.

Heat 1

Heat 2

Heat 3

Heat 4

Heat 5

Semifinals

Qual. rule: first 4 of each heat (Q) qualified.

Heat 1

Heat 2

Final

References

External links
 Official Olympic Report, la84foundation.org. Retrieved August 15, 2012.

Athletics at the 1968 Summer Olympics
Sprint hurdles at the Olympics
1968 in women's athletics
Women's events at the 1968 Summer Olympics